Events from the year 1995 in Iran.

Incumbents
 Supreme Leader: Ali Khamenei
 President: Akbar Hashemi Rafsanjani 
 Vice President: Hassan Habibi
 Chief Justice: Mohammad Yazdii

Events

Births

 4 March – Mahan Baghdadi.

See also
 Years in Iraq
 Years in Afghanistan

References

 
Iran
Years of the 20th century in Iran
1990s in Iran
Iran